Zion-St. Mark's Evangelical Lutheran Church, formerly known as Deutsche Evangelische Kirche von Yorkville and Zion Lutheran Church, is a historic Lutheran church at 339-341 East 84th Street in Yorkville, Manhattan, New York City. The congregation is a member of the Evangelical Lutheran Church in America.

Building
The neo-Gothic structure was built in 1888 as the Deutsche Evangelische Kirche von Yorkville. The building became Zion Lutheran Church in 1892, when that congregation was founded. It is now Zion-St. Mark's Church. The German-speaking congregation grew rapidly with the influx of mass immigration from Germany to the United States at the end of the 19th and the beginning of the 20th centuries and merged with St. Mark's Evangelical Lutheran Church of New York City in 1946. The building was added to the National Register of Historic Places in 1995.

References

External links
 Official website

Churches in Manhattan
German-American culture in New York City
Properties of religious function on the National Register of Historic Places in Manhattan
Churches completed in 1888
Lutheran churches in New York City
Yorkville, Manhattan
Gothic Revival church buildings in New York City
Religious organizations established in 1892

Evangelical Lutheran Church in America